Sheila Helena Elizabeth Kitzinger MBE (29 March 1929 – 11 April 2015) was a British natural childbirth activist and author on childbirth and pregnancy. She wrote more than 20 books and had a worldwide reputation as a passionate and committed advocate for change.

Life and work 
Kitzinger was born in Taunton, Somerset. She was a social anthropologist specialising in pregnancy, childbirth and the parenting of babies and young children.  She campaigned for women to have the information they need to make choices about childbirth and was a well known advocate for breastfeeding. She joined the advisory board of the National Childbirth Trust (NCT) in 1958 as a teacher and trainer.

She held academic posts at the University of Edinburgh and the Open University, and was an honorary professor at the University of West London, where she taught the MA in midwifery in the Wolfson School of Health Sciences. She also taught workshops on the social anthropology of birth and breastfeeding. She wrote many articles and books and was active in midwifery education in the UK and internationally. She lectured widely in the USA and Canada, the Caribbean, Israel, Australia, Latin America, South Africa and Japan and worked as a consultant to the International Childbirth Education Association.

She was a strong believer that all women who are not at high risk should be given the choice of a home birth. Her books cover women's experiences of breastfeeding, antenatal care, birth plans, induction of labour, epidurals, episiotomy, hospital care in childbirth, children's experiences of being present at birth and post traumatic stress following childbirth. Some of her writing was controversial for its time; The Good Birth Guide (1979) may have caused a rift in her relationship with the NCT and she was often at odds with radical feminist views. Her work is considered influential in changing the culture in which women give birth She believed that: "Birth is a major life transition. It is – must be – also a political issue, in terms of the power of the medical system, how it exercises control over women and whether it enables them to make decisions about their own bodies and their babies." She was awarded an MBE in 1982 in recognition of her services to education for childbirth.

In 1987 she made an extended appearance on television in the first series of Channel 4's After Dark.  From the late 1980s she was series editor for Pandora Press's Issues in Women’s Health; the books in this series included her own The Midwife Challenge, and also Gabrielle Palmer's seminal The Politics of Breastfeeding.

Kitzinger died of cancer in Oxfordshire in 2015 after a short illness. Her autobiography, A Passion for Birth: My Life: Anthropology, Family and Feminism, was published shortly after her death. She has five children; her daughter Celia Kitzinger is a scholar and activist.

Bibliography
 A Passion for Birth: My Life: Anthropology, Family and Feminism, Pinter & Martin 2015, 
 Birth & Sex: The Power and the Passion, Pinter & Martin 2012, 
 Improving Maternity Services: Small Is Beautiful - Lessons from a Birth Centre (Foreword), Radcliffe Publishing Ltd 2006, 
 Birth Crisis, Routledge 2006, 
 The Politics of Birth, Elsevier, USA 2005, 
 Understanding Your Crying Baby, Carroll & Brown 2005, 
 The New Experience of Childbirth, Orion 2004
 The New Pregnancy & Childbirth - Choices & Challenges, Dorling Kindersley 2003
 Birth Your Way: Choosing birth at home or in a birth centre, Dorling Kindersley 2002, reissued by Fresh Heart Publishing 2011, 
 Rediscovering Birth, Little, Brown 2000, reissued by Pinter & Martin 2011, 
 Becoming a Grandmother: A Life Transition, Simon & Schuster 1997, 
 Birth over Thirty-Five, Sheldon Press 1994, 
 The Year after Childbirth: Surviving and Enjoying the First Year of Motherhood, Scribner 1994, 
 Ourselves as Mothers, Bantam 1992, 
 The Midwife Challenge (Issues in Women's Health series), Pandora Press 1991, 
 Pregnancy Day by Day: The Expectant Mother's Diary, Record Book, and Guide, Knopf 1990, 
 The Crying Baby, Penguin Books 1990, 
 Breastfeeding Your Baby, Dorling Kindersley 1989
 Your Baby, Your Way, Pantheon Books 1987, 
 Giving Birth, How it Really Feels, Victor Gollancz Ltd 1987, 
 Being Born, Grosset & Dunlap 1986, 
 A Celebration of Birth: The Experience of Childbirth, Penguin 5th ed 1984
 Woman's Experience of Sex Penguin 1983
 Birth Over 30, HarperCollins 1982, 
 The Complete Book of Pregnancy and Childbirth Dorling Kindersley 1980, rev 1989, rev 1996, rev 2004  (Knopf US edition)
 The Good Birth Guide, Croom Helm 1979, 
 Giving Birth: The Parents' Emotions in Childbirth, Victor Gollancz 1971
 With Women: Midwives experiences: from shift work to continuity of care, David Vernon 2007

References

External links
 Sheila Kitzinger's website
 KITZINGER, Sheila Helena Elizabeth International Who's Who. accessed 4 September 2006.

1929 births
2015 deaths
Breastfeeding activists
Midwifery
Academics of the University of West London
People from Taunton
Members of the Order of the British Empire
Maternal health
Natural childbirth advocates
Alumni of the University of Oxford
Feminism and health
Maternity in the United Kingdom
Parent education program
British women writers
British women academics
Academics of the University of Edinburgh
British family and parenting writers
20th-century British writers
21st-century British writers
British health activists